Ørjan Røyrane (born 10 July 1988 in Kvinnherad) is a Norwegian football midfielder who most recently played for Kongsvinger.

He made his debut for Norheimsund IL in the Norwegian Second Division in 2004. After the 2005 season he signed for Sandefjord Fotball together with his older brother Jon André.

His brother was sold to Løv-Ham Fotball after the 2007 season.

Career statistics

References

1988 births
Living people
People from Kvinnherad
Norwegian footballers
Sandefjord Fotball players
Kongsvinger IL Toppfotball players
Norwegian First Division players
Eliteserien players
Association football midfielders
Sportspeople from Vestland